The Martin Classical Lectures is a function of the Charles Beebe Martin Foundation established at Oberlin College in Ohio.

Charles Beebe Martin was a professor of Classics and classical archaeology at the College from 1880 to 1925.  The foundation was set up to honor his memory.

Works produced by the foundation
Lectures given at the foundation are collected and presented in volumes. Dates given are those of publication.

Volumes published by Harvard University Press
Volume 1, Louis E. Lord (1931)
Volume 2 Aspects of Social Behavior in Ancient Rome, Tenney Frank (1932)
Volume 3 Attic Vase-painting, Charles Seltman  (1933)
Volume 4 Humanistic Value of Archaeology Rhys Carpenter (1933)
Volume 5 Greek Ideals and Modern Life, Sir. R. W. Livingstone (1935)
Volume 6 Five men; character studies from the Roman Empire, by Martin Percival (M. P.) Charlesworth (1936)
Volume 7 Early Greek elegists, Cecil Maurice (C. M.) Bowra (1938)
Volume 8 The Roman art of war under the republic, Frank E. Adcock (1940)
Volume 9 Epigraphica attica, Benjamin Dean Meritt (1940)
Volume 10 Archaic Attic gravestones, Gisela M. A. Richter (1944)
Volume 11 Greek personality in archaic sculpture, Georg Heinrich Karo (1948)
Volume 12 Thucydides and the world war, Louis E. Lord (1945)
Volume 13 Classical influences in Renaissance literature, Douglas Bush (1952)
Volume 14 Pindar and Aeschylus, John Huston Finley (1955)
Volume 15 Classics and Renaissance thought, Paul Oskar Kristeller (1955) and as Renaissance thought, the classic, scholastic and humanist strains (1961)
Volume 16 Ancient book illumination, Kurt Weitzmann (1959)
Volume 17 Boundaries of Dionysus; Athenian foundations for the theory of tragedy, Alfred Cary Schlesinger (1963)
Volume 18 Society and civilization in Greece and Rome, Victor Ehrenberg (1964)
Volume 19 Aristophanes and the comic hero, Cedric H. Whitman (1964)
Volume 20 Origin and early form of Greek tragedy, Gerald Else (1965)
Volume 21 The meaning of Stoicism, Ludwig Edelstein (1966)
Volume 22 Rubens and the classical tradition, Wolfgang Stechow (1968)
Volume 23 The Athenian aristocracy, 399 to 31 B.C., Paul Lachlan MacKendrick (1969)
Volume 24 Thucydides on the nature of power, A. G. (Arthur Geoffrey) Woodhead (1970)
Volume 25 Isis among the Greeks and Romans, Friedrich Solmsen (1979)
Volume 26 Tragedy and civilization : an interpretation of Sophocles, Charles Segal (1981)
Volume 27 Aristotle and the Renaissance, Charles B. Schmitt (1983)
Volume 28 Herodotean narrative and discourse, Mabel Lang (1984)
Volume 29 The art of Bacchylides, Anne Pippin Burnett (1985)
Volume 30 Homer and the Nibelungenlied : comparative studies in epic style Bernard Fenik (1986)

Volumes published by Princeton University Press
Man in the middle voice: name and narration in the Odyssey, John Peradotto (1990)

External links
Martin Classical Lectures
2001 Lecture Series

Classical studies